Melitopolsky Uyezd was one of the subdivisions of the Taurida Governorate of the Russian Empire. It was situated in the northern part of the governorate. Its administrative centre was Melitopol.

Demographics
At the time of the Russian Empire Census of 1897, Melitopolsky Uyezd had a population of 384,239. Of these, 54.9% spoke Ukrainian, 32.8% Russian, 5.2% German, 4.2% Yiddish, 0.9% Belarusian, 0.6% Polish, 0.5% Bulgarian, 0.3% Crimean Tatar, 0.2% Czech, 0.1% Armenian, 0.1% Greek and 0.1% Romani as their native language.

References

 
Uyezds of Taurida Governorate